Kramatorsk is a city in the eponymous raion and hromada of Donetsk Oblast in Ukraine.

Kramatorsk may also refer to:

 Kramatorsk Raion, a district of Donetsk Oblast, Ukraine
 Kramatorsk Hromada, Kramatorsk Raion, Donetsk Oblast, Ukraine; see List of hromadas of Ukraine
 Kramatorsk Airport, Kramatorsk, Donetsk, Ukraine
 Kramatorsk railway station, Kramatorsk, Donetsk, Ukraine
 Battle of Kramatorsk (2014), at the start of the Donbas War of Secession during the Russo-Ukrainian War
 FC Kramatorsk, a soccer team in Kramatorsk, Kramatorsk, Donetsk, Ukraine
 , a Soviet era Zubr-class LCAC hover landing craft of the Ukrainian Navy

See also

 
 Kramatorsk radiological accident (1980-1989)
 Kramatorsk railway bombing (2022), during the Russian invasion of Ukraine
 New Kramatorsk Machinebuilding Factory, Kramatorsk, Kramatorsk, Donetsk, Ukraine